Cindy Gerard is an American author of romantic suspense and romance novels. Her book Feel the Heat won the 2009 Romantic Intrigue Award from Romantic Times.

Gerard lives in Marengo, Iowa.

Bibliography

One-Eyed Jacks Series
 Killing Time, Pocket Books, 2013 (Mike Brown & Eva Salinas) 
 The Way Home, Pocket Books, 2013 
 Running Blind, Pocket Books, 2015 (Jamie Cooper & Rhonda Burns)

Black Ops Inc. Series
 Show No Mercy, Pocket Books, 2008 ( Gabriel & Jenna )
 Take No Prisoners, Pocket Books, 2008 ( Sam & Abbie )
 Whisper No Lies, Pocket Books, 2008 ( Reed & Crystal )
 Feel the Heat, Pocket Books, 2009 ( Rafael & B.J. )
 Risk No Secrets, Pocket Books, 2010 ( Wyatt & Sophie )
 With No Remorse, Pocket Books, 2011 ( Luke & Valentina )
 Last Man Standing, Pocket Books, 2012 ( Joe & Stephanie )

Bodyguard Series
 To the Edge, St. Martin’s Press, 2005 (Nolan & Jillian)
 To the Limit, St. Martin’s Press, 2005 (Eve & Mac)
 To the Brink, St. Martin’s Press, 2005 (Ethan & Darcy)
 Over the Line, St. Martin’s Press, 2006 (Jase & Janey)
 Under the Wire, St. Martin’s Press, 2006 (Manny & Lily)
 Into the Dark, St. Martin’s Press, 2007 (Dallas & Amy)

Other
 Desert Heat, St. Martin’s Press, 2011

Silhouette Desire Books
 The Cowboy Takes a Lady, 1995
 The Bride Wore Blue, 1996
 Lucas: The Loner, 1996
 A Bride for Crimson Falls, 1997
A Bride for Abel Greene, 1997
 Marriage, Outlaw Style, 1998
 The Outlaw’s Wife, 1998
 Lone Star Prince, 1999
 The Outlaw Jesse James, 1999
 In His Loving Arms, 2000
 The Bridal Arrangement, 2001
 Lone Star Knight, 2001
 The Secret Baby Bond, 2002
 Taming the Outlaw, 2002
 The Bluewater Affair, 2003
 The Librarian’s Passionate Knight, 2003
 Tempting the Tycoon, 2003
 Breathless for the Bachelor, 2004
 Storm of Seduction, 2004
 Between Midnight and Morning, 2005
 Black-Tie Seduction, 2005
 A Convenient Proposition, 2006

Bantam Loveswept Books
 Into the Night, 1994
 Perfect Double, 1993
 Dream Tide, 1993
 Man Around the House, 1993
 Slow Burn, 1992
 Temptation from the Past, 1991
 Maverick, 1991

Anthologies
 Rescue Me, with Cherry Adair and Lora Leigh, St. Martin’s Press, 2008
 Deadly Promises, with Sherrilyn Kenyon, Laura Griffin and Dianna Love, Pocket Books, 2010

References

External links
 
 Publisher's Author Page

Living people
American romantic fiction writers
People from Marengo, Iowa
RITA Award winners
Year of birth missing (living people)